Acidiostigma is a genus of tephritid or fruit flies in the family Tephritidae.

Acidiostigma species

 Acidiostigma amoenum (Wang, 1990)

 Acidiostigma apicale (Bezzi, 1913)

 Acidiostigma bimaculatum (Wang, 1998)

 Acidiostigma bomiensis (Wang, 1998)

 Acidiostigma brevigaster (Han & Wang, 1997)

 Acidiostigma brunneum (Wang, 1990)

 Acidiostigma cheni (Han & Wang, 1997)

 Acidiostigma harmandi (Seguy, 1934)

 Acidiostigma longipenne (Hendel, 1927)

 Acidiostigma lucens (Munro, 1935)

 Acidiostigma montanum (Wang, 1998)

 Acidiostigma nigritum (Wang, 1990)

 Acidiostigma nigrofasciola (Chen & Zao, 2016)

 Acidiostigma omeium (Han & Wang, 1997)

 Acidiostigma polyfasciatum (Miyake, 1919)

 Acidiostigma postsignatum (Chen, 1948)

 Acidiostigma s-nigrum (Matsumura, 1916)

 Acidiostigma sonani (Shiraki, 1933)

 Acidiostigma spimaculatum (Wang, 1993)

 Acidiostigma subpostsignatum (Chen & Zao, 2016)

 Acidiostigma tongmaiense (Chen & Zao, 2016)

 Acidiostigma voilaceum (Wang, 1990)

 Acidiostigma yoshinoi (Shiraki, 1933)

References

Trypetinae
Tephritidae genera